The Outstanding British Contribution to Cinema Award is an annual award, first introduced in 1979 and presented in honor of Michael Balcon, given by the British Academy of Film and Television Arts charity. The first recipients was the special visual effects team from the 1978 film Superman.

Honorees

References

British Academy Film Awards
 
Lifetime achievement awards
Awards established in 1979
1979 establishments in the United Kingdom